Liepna is a village in Liepna Parish, Alūksne Municipality, Latvia and the center of the parish.

Liepna was established after 1840 near the center of Lipna manor. In 1926, it was granted the status of a densely populated area. In Liepna, there is a parish administration, 2 shops, a primary school, a folk house, a library, an ambulance, three churches (Catholic, Lutheran, Orthodox). Until 2019, there was also a boarding primary school.

References 

Towns and villages in Latvia
Alūksne Municipality